The Mark 54 Lightweight Torpedo (formerly known as Lightweight Hybrid Torpedo, or LHT) is a standard  anti-submarine warfare (ASW) torpedo used by the United States Navy.

Development 
The Mark 54 was co-developed by Raytheon Integrated Defense Systems and the U.S. Navy under the U.S. Navy's Lightweight Hybrid Torpedo program in response to perceived problems with the extant Mark 50 and Mark 46 torpedoes.  The Mk 50, having been developed to counter very high performance nuclear submarines such as the Soviet Alfa class, was seen as too expensive to use against relatively slow conventional submarines. The older Mk 46, designed for open-ocean use, performed poorly in the littoral areas, where the Navy envisioned itself likely to operate in the future.

The Mk 54 was created by combining the homing portion of the Mk 50 and the warhead and propulsion sections of the Mk 46, improved for better performance in shallow water, and with the addition of commercial off-the-shelf (COTS) technology to further reduce costs. It shares much of the software and computer hardware of the Mk 48 ADCAP heavy torpedo, based around a custom PowerPC 603e microprocessor.

Developmental testing began in July 1999, and a successful critical design review was completed in November 1999.

In April 2003, Raytheon was awarded a sole source contract for the production of the Mk 54. Full rate production began in October 2004. In March 2010 the Fifth Fleet requested improvements in the Mk 54's performance against diesel-electric submarines via an Urgent Operational Need Statement (UONS). This led to a software Block Upgrade (BUG) program which began testing in August 2011 and which continues, having been criticised by the Director, Operational Test and Evaluation (DOT&E) for using unrealistic proxies for threat submarines.

The Mk 54 can be fired from surface ships via the Mark 32 surface vessel torpedo tubes or the vertical launch anti-submarine rocket (ASROC) systems, and also from most ASW aircraft, although they are slightly different lengths and weights. The P-8 Poseidon uses the High-Altitude Anti-Submarine Warfare Weapons Capability (HAAWC) GPS-guided parachute kit to drop torpedoes from high altitude.

The FY14 DOT&E report assessed the Mk 54 (BUG) torpedo as not operationally effective in its intended role: "During operationally challenging and realistic scenarios, the Mk 54 (BUG) demonstrated below threshold performance and exhibited many of the same failure mechanisms observed during the FY 2004 initial operational testing".  Shortfalls were also identified with the employing platforms’ tactics and tactical documentation, and interoperability problems with some platform fire control systems.

Operators

Current operators

 Royal Australian Navy - In October 2010, Australia ordered 200 more torpedoes.
 
 Brazilian Navy - In December 2020, the US Department of State approved for $70 million, the sale for Brazil of 22 Mk 54 lightweight torpedo conversion kits for the Mk 46 Mod 5A torpedoes already in operation in the S-70B helicopters of the Brazilian Navy, plus ancillary training, exercise and maintenance spare parts.

 Royal Canadian Air Force 
 Royal Canadian Navy
In May 2019 Canada requested 425 Mk 54 lightweight torpedo conversion kits, plus ancillary training, exercise and maintenance spare parts. This procurement will allow Canada to upgrade its current inventory of Mk 46 torpedoes. The Mk 54 lightweight torpedoes are expected to be used on the Royal Canadian Navy's Halifax-class frigates, and the Royal Canadian Air Force's CP-140 Aurora aircraft. The torpedoes are also planned to be deployed from the CH-148 maritime helicopters. On 17 May 2019, the U.S. State Department approved the sale worth US$387 Million (C$514 Million in 2019.) Under Canada's Industrial and Technological Benefits Policy, Canada negotiated an Offset agreement with Raytheon before signing the final deal in order to leverage jobs and economic benefits in Canada.

 Indian Navy - In June 2011, it was reported that India will get 32 Mk 54 All-Up-Round Lightweight Torpedoes and associated equipment, parts, training and logistical support for an estimated cost of $86 million through U.S. government's Foreign Military Sales program for P-8I LRMP.

 Mexican Navy - In early 2018 the U.S. State Department approved the sale of Mark 54 torpedoes to the Mexican Navy, who will deploy them from their new Sigma-class design frigates, the first of which is being jointly built with Dutch shipbuilding company Damen Schelde Naval Shipbuilding. In April 2018, the US State Department cleared the sale of an additional 30 Mark 54 torpedoes to the Mexican Navy, which may be carried on MH-60R helicopters, which the Mexican Navy plans to order in the near future.

 Royal New Zealand Air Force - Have an undisclosed number with the purchase of the P8-A. It was known that the upgrade from the Mk 46 was going to happen via the "Defence Capability Plan 2019" and was stated in the RNZAF News (Page 25)  that weapons was the Mark 54 Torpedo. It is unknown whether the Royal New Zealand Navy have replaced their Mk46 at this stage.

 Royal Netherlands Navy - In 2018 the Royal Netherlands Navy acquired MK 54 torpedoes via the Foreign Military Sales process.

 Royal Air Force - In January 2018 it was announced that the P-8 Poseidon aircraft to be operated by the RAF will carry the Mk 54.

 United States Navy

See also
 APR-3E torpedo - Russian equivalent
 A244-S - Italian equivalent
 MU90 Impact - French/Italian equivalent
 Sting Ray (torpedo) - British equivalent
 TAL Shyena - Indian equivalent
 Yu-7 torpedo - Chinese equivalent
 K745 Chung Sang Eo - South Korean equivalent
 Type 97 light weight torpedo (G-RX4) - Japanese equivalent

References

External links

MK-54 Lightweight Hybrid Torpedo via FAS
MK-54 at deagel.com

Torpedoes of the United States
Aerial torpedoes
Raytheon Company products
Military equipment introduced in the 2000s